Joan Weliky Conaway is an American biochemist who researches gene transcription. She worked at the Stowers Institute for Medical Research from 2001 to 2021 and currently serves as Vice Provost and Dean for Basic Research at the University of Texas Southwestern Medical Center. She is a member of the National Academy of Sciences and American Academy of Arts and Sciences .

Early life and education
Joan Weliky grew up in Pittsburgh, Pennsylvania and New York. Her father Irving Weliky and her mother Virginia , were both biochemists, though Virginia gave up her work to be a full-time homemaker. She attended Bryn Mawr College, where she was initially undecided between majoring in biomedical science or political science. After her freshman year, she worked in a pharmaceutical company's immunology lab, which was when she made up her mind to become a biomedical scientist. She later was a graduate student at Stanford University under the advisorship of future Nobel laureate Roger D. Kornberg, graduating with a PhD in cell biology.

Career
After finishing her PhD, she completed a postdoctoral research appointment at DNAX Research Institute. She then worked at Oklahoma Medical Research Foundation. In 2001 she joined the faculty of the Stowers Institute for Medical Research in Kansas City, Missouri. In 2005 she became Helen Nelson Distinguished Chair at Stowers Institute. While at the Stowers Institute, she was additionally a professor in University of Kansas School of Medicine's Department of Biochemistry and Molecular Biology. In 2021, she moved to the University of Texas Southwestern Medical Center, where she holds the Cecil H. Green Distinguished Chair in Cellular and Molecular Biology and is Vice Provost, Dean of Basic Research, and Professor of Molecular Biology. With her husband, Ron Conaway, she publishes research about the mechanisms of gene transcription.

Awards and honors
In 2002 she became a member of the American Academy of Arts and Sciences. She is a recipient of the Edward L. and Thelma Gaylord Award for Scientific Excellence (1991) and the ASBMB – Amgen Award (1997). In 2020 she was elected to the National Academy of Sciences in the biochemistry division.

Personal life
She is married to fellow researcher Ronald Conaway. She and Ronald enjoy jazz performances.

References

Living people
American biochemists
Year of birth missing (living people)
Bryn Mawr College alumni
Stanford University alumni
Members of the United States National Academy of Sciences
Fellows of the American Academy of Arts and Sciences
American women scientists
Stowers Institute for Medical Research people
21st-century American women